The qualification for the Basketball at the 2008 Summer Olympics – Women's tournament took place between 2006 and 2008; all five FIBA zones sent in teams.

The first qualifying tournament was the 2006 FIBA World Championship for Women in which the champion was guaranteed of a place in the Olympics. Throughout the next two years, several regional tournaments served as qualification for the zonal tournaments, which doubles as continental championships, to determine which teams will participate in the 2008 Beijing Summer Olympics.

Qualification

Outright qualification
A total of 12 teams will take part in the Olympics, with each NOC sending in one team. The host nation (the People's Republic of China) qualifies automatically as hosts.

There are a total of 5 zonal tournaments (doubling as continental championships) that determined the qualifying teams, with a total of 5 teams qualifying outright. Each zone was allocated with the following qualifying berths:
FIBA Africa: 1 team (Champion)
FIBA Americas: 1 teams (Champion)
FIBA Asia: 1 team (Champion)
FIBA Europe: 1 teams (Champion)
FIBA Oceania: 1 team (Champion)

Furthermore, the current world champion, Australia qualified automatically by winning at the 2006 FIBA World Championship for Women.

Qualification via the wildcard tournament
The additional five teams will be determined at the FIBA World Olympic Qualifying Tournament for Women 2008, with the best non-qualifying teams participating from teams that did not qualify outright. Each zone is allocated with the following berths:

FIBA Africa: 2 teams
FIBA Americas: 3 teams
FIBA Asia: 2 teams
FIBA Europe: 4 teams
FIBA Oceania: 1 team

Summary
These are the final standings of the different Olympic qualifying tournaments. The venues are as follows, with the city of the knockout stage mentioned first:
2006 FIBA World Championship for Women: São Paulo and Barueri, Brazil
FIBA Africa Championship for Women 2007: Dakar and Thies, Senegal
FIBA Americas Championship for Women 2007: Valdivia, Chile
FIBA Asia Championship for Women 2007: Incheon, South Korea
EuroBasket Women 2007: Chieti, Vasto, Lanciano, and Ortona, Italy
FIBA Oceania Championship for Women 2007: Dunedin, New Zealand
FIBA World Olympic Qualifying Tournament for Women 2008: Madrid, Spain

Qualified teams
The twelve teams that qualified for Beijing 2008 are:

The italicized teams are the wildcards.

References

 
2008
qualification